The Part Time Wife is a 1925 American silent drama film directed by Henry McCarty and starring Alice Calhoun, Robert Ellis and Freeman Wood. The film was produced by the independent company Gotham Pictures. It was based on a short story of the same title by Peggy Gaddis. It was released in Britain the following year by Stoll Pictures.

Synopsis
Film star Doris Fuller marries financially-struggling journalist Kenneth Scott but he is humiliated by being referred to as "Mr. Dorris Fuller". His wife quits her work to be become a full-time wife but their money problems lead her to return to acting. Believing she is having an affair, Scott begins courting a rising young actress Nita Northrup leading to a breach in the marriage. Eventually they reconcile after Scott's new play becomes a hit, and a studio injury to Doris leads her to quit her film career.

Cast
 Alice Calhoun as Doris Fuller
 Robert Ellis as Kenneth Scott
 Freeman Wood as DeWitt Courtney
 Edwards Davis as Ben Ellis
 Janice Peters as Nita Northrup
 Patricia Palmer as 'Toddles' Thornton
 Charles West as Allen Keane

References

Bibliography
 Connelly, Robert B. The Silents: Silent Feature Films, 1910-36, Volume 40, Issue 2. December Press, 1998.
 Munden, Kenneth White. The American Film Institute Catalog of Motion Pictures Produced in the United States, Part 1. University of California Press, 1997.

External links
 

1925 films
1925 drama films
1920s English-language films
American silent feature films
Silent American drama films
Films directed by Henry McCarty
American black-and-white films
Gotham Pictures films
1920s American films
English-language drama films